The 2008 AIG Japan Open Tennis Championships was a combined men's and women's tennis tournament played on outdoor hard courts. It was the 35th edition of the event known that year as the AIG Japan Open Tennis Championships, and was part of the International Series Gold of the 2008 ATP Tour, and of the Tier III Series of the 2008 WTA Tour. Both the men's and the women's events took place at the Ariake Coliseum in Tokyo, Japan, from September 29 through October 5, 2008.

The men's field was led by ATP No. 5, Valencia and 's-Hertogenbosch winner, Tokyo defending champion David Ferrer, Dubai, San Jose and Beijing champion Andy Roddick, and Olympic silver medalist, Viña del Mar, Munich titlist Fernando González. Also present were Stuttgart finalist Richard Gasquet, Stuttgart, Kitzbühel, Los Angeles, Washington winner Juan Martín del Potro, Tommy Robredo, Jo-Wilfried Tsonga and Mikhail Youzhny.

The women's line up included Stockholm and New Haven champion Caroline Wozniacki, Fes and Portorož runner-up, Strasbourg winner Anabel Medina Garrigues, and Wimbledon semifinalist Jie Zheng. Other seeded players were Estoril, Barcelona and Seoul titlist Maria Kirilenko, French Open quarterfinalist Kaia Kanepi, Shahar Pe'er, Tamarine Tanasugarn and Aleksandra Wozniak.

Finals

Men's singles

 Tomáš Berdych defeated  Juan Martín del Potro, 6–1, 6–4
It was Tomáš Berdych's 1st title of the year, and his 4th overall.

Women's singles

 Caroline Wozniacki defeated  Kaia Kanepi, 6–2, 3–6, 6–1
It was Caroline Wozniacki's 3rd title of the year, and overall.

Men's doubles

 Mikhail Youzhny /  Mischa Zverev defeated  Lukáš Dlouhý /  Leander Paes, 6–3, 6–4

Women's doubles

 Jill Craybas /  Marina Erakovic defeated  Ayumi Morita /  Aiko Nakamura, 4–6, 7–5, [10–6]

External links
Official website
Men's Singles draw
Men's Doubles draw
Men's Qualifying Singles dDraw
Women's Singles, Doubles, and Qualifying Singles draws

AIG Japan Open Tennis Championships
AIG Japan Open Tennis Championships
AIG Japan Open Tennis Championships
AIG Japan Open Tennis Championships
2008
Tennis Championships